Arnór Smárason (born 7 September 1988) is an Icelandic footballer who plays for Icelandic second-tier 1. deild karla side ÍA Akranes. He can play in all the positions on the midfield.

Early life
Arnór was born in Akranes, Iceland, and is a cousin of Pétur Pétursson. He started his football career at the local club ÍA Akranes, before moving to Norway at age 15 together with his family. He played a year with Molde FK as his father was attending Molde University College, before returning to Iceland. A year later, Arnór moved to the Netherlands to join up with the youth teams of SC Heerenveen, following a successful trial.

Club career

Hereenveen
Arnór signed his first professional contract with Hereenveen on 9 September 2007, aged 19. He made his senior debut the same season, during the spring of 2008, whilst also signing a new three-year deal with the Eredivisie side.

During the following season, in 2008–09, Arnór became a regular starter for Heerenveen. He made his continental debut for the club in the Europa League on 18 September 2008, coming on as a late sub in a 1–1 draw against the Portuguese side Vitória. Nearly a month later, on 19 October 2008, Arnór scored his first competitive goal for the club in a 2–2 draw against Roda. That season Heerenveen finished 5th in the Eredivisie and went all the way to the final in the KNVB Cup. They eventually won against Twente, 2–2 after full-time and 5–4 on penalties, though Arnór remained on the bench as an unused sub. In all, Arnór played 27 games for Hereenveen during the season and scored 5 goals.

Due to a serious back injury, Arnór missed most of the 2009–10 league play. He was sent to the clinic of Bayern Munich club doctor Hans-Wilhelm Müller-Wohlfahrt, who treated him during the spring of 2010. He returned to the pitch in March the same year, playing two competitive games throughout the season. At the same time, Heerenveen communicated that Arnór would leave the club as a free transfer the upcoming summer, due to the club's financial difficulties.

Esbjerg
In June 2010, he moved to Esbjerg fB in Denmark. Arnór signed a three year-deal with the Superliga club. He went straight into Esbjerg's first team and played his first game in the opening round of the 2010-11 season, a 0–3 loss against Odense. He scored his first goal for the club on 28 August 2010 against Silkeborg, in a 2–1 win. He went on to play 24 of Esbjerg's 33 games in the league, when the team disappointingly finished at the foot of the table and was relegated to the 1st Division.

Esbjerg made a quick return to the Danish top tier. With six rounds left of the 2011–12 Danish 1st Division, they were crowned champions and had already won their promotion. Arnór played 19 games for his side throughout the season, being used as a rotation player, scoring 5 goals.

Arnór started his first game of the 2012–13 season in the third round against SønderjyskE, where he scored in 1–3 loss. In the same game, Arnór attracted a knee injury that kept him sidelined during the fall of 2012. He made his come back on 8 November in a Danish Cup fixture against Aalborg, 0–0 after full-time and 4–2 on penalties, where Arnór slotted home his kick from the spot. After a tough winter with limited playing time, Arnór broke into the starting eleven during the end of the campaign, starting in Esbjerg's last 7 games of the season, in which he scored 5 goals. On 9 May 2013, Esbjerg won the Danish Cup following a 1–0 victory against Randers in the final. Arnór was picked in the starting eleven and was subbed off during extra time. During the summer of 2013, he parted ways with Esbjerg at the end of his contract, on mutual consent.

Helsingborgs IF and loan spell at Torpedo Moscow
In July 2013, Arnór moved to Helsingborgs IF in Sweden on a three and a half-year deal. He was sought out as a replacement for Alejandro Bedoya, who had recently been sold to the French club Nantes. At the time of his arrival, midway through the 2013 season, Helsingborg was situated 2nd in the Allsvenskan table. Arnór made his debut for the side on 15 July, in a 3–0 win against Östers IF. His first goal for the club came only weeks later, on 5 August, in a 1–2 away loss against Djurgårdens IF. Eventually, Helsingborg dropped off from the top positions and finished 5th in Allsvenskan. Arnór played 14 competitive games during the season, scoring 4 goals.

During the 2014 Allsvenskan, Arnór played 27 out of 30 games in the league, scoring 3 goals. In addition, he had a successful run in the Svenska Cupen, scoring 2 goals in 6 fixtures as Helsingborg made it all the way to the final. On 18 May 2014, his side lost the final against Elfsborg with a score of 0–1.

Ahead of the 2015 season, with two years left on his contract, Arnór was loaned to FC Torpedo Moscow in the Russian Football Premier League. In his debut on 15 March 2015 against Zenit Saint Petersburg, he scored an added-time scissor kick to equalise for his team in a 1–1 draw. In May 2015, the whole Torpedo squad went on strike due to their wages being unpaid since the start of the year. The team was then situated at the foot of the league. In all, Arnór played 11 games during his six month-loan spell at Torpedo, scoring 2 goals.

In the summer of 2015, Arnór returned to Helsingborg, only to be deemed surplus to requirements (due to his reported high salary) by then manager Henrik Larsson. Due to injuries in the squad, however, Arnór returned to the starting eleven and scored a long-range strike in a 3–1 win against AIK on 19 July 2015. He kept his place in the team throughout the rest of the season, scoring 5 goals in 14 matches and becoming Helsingborg's second best top scorer in the league.

Hammarby IF
On 10 December 2015, he signed for the Stockholm-based club Hammarby IF on a three-year deal. He reportedly moved on a free transfer, even though he had one year left on his contract with Helsingborg. He made his debut for Hammarby on 26 February 2016, in a 0–0 draw against Syrianska FC in the Svenska Cupen. A month later, Arnór scored a spectacular volley against fierce rivals AIK in the quarter final of the Svenska Cupen. Hammarby won the game on penalties after goalkeeper Ögmundur Kristinsson, a fellow countryman of Arnór, scored the decisive kick. During his first league season at the club, Arnór quickly established himself as a regular starter, making 27 appearances and scoring 4 goals.

At the beginning of 2017, under the reign of new manager Jakob Michelsen, Arnór Smárason was appointed as the new vice captain at Hammarby. He remained a starter for the team during the season, scoring 5 goals in 29 league games. However, in 2018 he was used sparingly by Hammarby and left the club on 27 July, signing with Lillestrøm SK in Eliteserien.

International career
Arnór Smárason was first called up to the Iceland U21s in 2007, making 10 appearances while scoring twice during the next four years.

He made his debut in the senior national team in a friendly against Wales on 21 May 2008, in a 0–1 loss. Arnór scored his first international goal for his country in a 2–0 friendly win against Liechtenstein on 11 February 2009.

Iceland qualified for their first major tournament, the UEFA Euro in France, in 2016. Arnór was, however, not called up to the squad by manager Lars Lagerbäck.

Career statistics

Club

International goals
Scores and results list Iceland's goal tally first.

Honours

Club
SC Heerenveen
 KNVB Cup: 2009

Esbjerg fB
 1st Division: 2011–12
 Danish Cup: 2012–13

References

External links

Dutch Leaguie stats - Voetbal International
Official Danish Superliga stats

1988 births
People from Akranes
Living people
Association football midfielders
Arnor Smarason
Arnor Smarason
Arnor Smarason
Arnor Smarason
SC Heerenveen players
Esbjerg fB players
Helsingborgs IF players
FC Torpedo Moscow players
Hammarby Fotboll players
Lillestrøm SK players
Valur (men's football) players
Íþróttabandalag Akraness players
Eredivisie players
Danish Superliga players
Danish 1st Division players
Allsvenskan players
Russian Premier League players
Eliteserien players
Arnor Smarason
Arnor Smarason
Expatriate footballers in Norway
Arnor Smarason
Expatriate footballers in the Netherlands
Arnor Smarason
Expatriate men's footballers in Denmark
Arnor Smarason
Expatriate footballers in Sweden
Arnor Smarason
Expatriate footballers in Russia
Arnor Smarason